Storm & Grace is the third and final studio album by American singer-songwriter Lisa Marie Presley. It was released on May 15, 2012, in the United States and Canada and was the singer's first album in seven years following the 2005 release Now What. Storm & Grace was her only album released via Universal Republic after having left her previous label, Capitol. The album was preceded by the lead single "You Ain't Seen Nothin' Yet". The album was produced by T Bone Burnett.

Production 
Presley originally began work on the album in 2010. She confirmed during an interview with Oprah Winfrey on "Oprah" that she was in London recording a new album which, at the time, was due for release in 2011.

"Just over two years ago, I went to England to attempt to write another record after finding myself in a considerably disheartened and uninspired state creatively. Over an 8-month period, I wrote 30 songs. I was fortunate to be able to write with some incredible artists and singers such as Richard Hawley (from Pulp), Ed Harcourt, Sacha Skarbek and Fran Healy (from Travis), to name a few," said Presley. "Nothing was planned or contrived in any way, and out of it came a very organic record that was always inside of me and that I am incredibly proud of. It was a dream come true and such an honor when T Bone liked the songs and produced and played on the record."

"When songs from Lisa Marie Presley showed up at my door, I was curious. I wondered what the daughter of an American revolutionary music artist had to say. What I heard was honest, raw, unaffected and soulful. I thought her father would be proud of her. The more I listened to the songs, the deeper an artist I found her to be. Listening beyond the media static, Lisa Marie Presley is a Southern American folk music artist of great value," said Burnett.

Presley performed on American Idol on May 17, 2012, to promote the album.

Promotion 
To promote both Storm & Grace and the single "You Ain't Seen Nothin' Yet", Presley and her label announced promotional stops throughout the release week of May 14 to 18. On May 15, Presley appeared on the morning news program Good Morning America, American Idol on May 17, The Tonight Show with Jay Leno on May 21 and Jimmy Kimmel Live! on May 22. Presley also celebrated the album's release by signing copies of the disc at Sun Studios in Memphis, Tennessee on Monday, May 14, 2012, while on May 17 American Express sponsored and presented "An Evening with Lisa Marie Presley" at the Grammy Museum's Clive Davis Theater.

Critical reception 
Spinner.com observed: "Presley has made the strongest album of her career in the upcoming Storm & Grace. It's a moody masterpiece, exploring the demons and angels of her life to the tune of country-spiced downbeat pop."

Rolling Stone complimented the album by saying, "Storm & Grace is the album she was born to make – a raw, powerful country, folk and blues collection that finds her embracing her Southern roots and family name", while Entertainment Weekly praised its "smoky, spooky single 'You Ain't Seen Nothing Yet'."

"On her first two albums, Lisa Marie Presley wanted to be a pop star with a difference; on Storm & Grace, she clearly would rather be an artist, and if she's still working her musical shortcomings out of her system, this is a stronger, more mature, and more effective work than one might have expected. Nearly ten years into a recording career she may or may not have wanted, Presley is finally developing a musical personality that truly suits her," Allmusic said, complimenting of Presley's work on the album.

Commercial performance
Storm & Grace debuted at number 45 on the US Billboard 200, including number 21 on the Top Rock Albums chart selling over 9,000 copies in its first week.

Track listing

Personnel
Credits for Storm & Grace adapted from AllMusic.

Paul Ackling – guitar technician
Frank Arigo – product manager
Jay Bellerose – drums
Sandy Brummels – art direction
T Bone Burnett – guitar, producer
Mike Compton – mandolin
Dennis Crouch – bass
Zach Dawes – bass
Kyle Ford – second engineer
Keefus Green – keyboards
Ed Harcourt – backing vocals

Lorna Leighton – art direction, design
Greg Leisz – pedal steel
Michael Lockwood – guitar
Greg Lotus – photography
Gavin Lurssen – mastering
Blake Mills – guitar
Vanessa Parr – engineer, second engineer
Lisa Marie Presley – lead and backing vocals
Ivy Skoff – production coordination
Jackson Smith – guitar
Patrick Warren – keyboards
Jason Wormer – engineer, mixing

Charts

Release history

References

2012 albums
Lisa Marie Presley albums
Albums produced by T Bone Burnett
Country albums by American artists
Folk albums by American artists
Blues albums by American artists
Roots rock albums
Universal Republic Records albums